In enzymology, a glutamate—methylamine ligase is an enzyme that catalyzes the chemical reaction

ATP + L-glutamate + methylamine  ADP + phosphate + N5-methyl-L-glutamine

The 3 substrates of this enzyme are ATP, L-glutamate, and methylamine, whereas its 3 products are ADP, phosphate, and N5-methyl-L-glutamine.

This enzyme belongs to the family of ligases, specifically those forming generic carbon-nitrogen bonds.  The systematic name of this enzyme class is L-glutamate:methylamine ligase (ADP-forming). This enzyme is also called gamma-glutamylmethylamide synthetase.

References

 

EC 6.3.4
Enzymes of unknown structure